Jolgeh-e Mazhan may refer to:
 Jolgeh-e Mazhan District
 Jolgeh-e Mazhan Rural District